Salus Football Club is a football club from Montevideo, Uruguay. They currently play in the Second Amateur Division, the third and last tier of the Uruguayan championship.

Titles
Segunda División Amateur (2): 1972, 1977
Divisional Extra (1): 1971

Salus
Salus
Salus
1928 establishments in Uruguay